= Cash Box Top 100 Pop Singles =

Song chart in U.S.

The Cash Box Top 100 Pop Singles (also known as the Cash Box Top 100) was a record chart in the United States for songs, published weekly by Cash Box magazine, which began publication in 1942. As a close competitor to Billboard magazine, it was first issued for the September 13, 1958 issue when they expanded their top 75 chart to one hundred positions. The original version of the magazine lasted through November 16, 1996. While Billboard ranked singles weekly mixing the total airplay on radio stations and singles sales from all across North America, Cash Box presented their rankings via all sales and airplay of songs without splitting up genres in order to formulate the generalized popularity of a single's overall presence. Many singles hit number one in Cash Box that didn't on Billboard and vice versa.

== See also ==
- Cash Box Pop Hits 1952-1996 by Joel Whitburn, Record Research Inc. (January 1, 2014)
